Mark Ian Langdon (25 September 1927 – 9 September 2014) was an Australian rules footballer who played with St Kilda in the Victorian Football League (VFL).

Notes

External links 

1927 births
Australian rules footballers from Victoria (Australia)
St Kilda Football Club players
People educated at Melbourne Grammar School
2014 deaths